Sam Llewellyn (born 1948) is a British author of literature for children and adults.

Biography
Sam Llewellyn was born on Tresco, Isles of Scilly, where his ancestors lived for many years. He grew up in Norfolk. He attended Eton College and later St Catherine's College, Oxford. Llewellyn went on to live in Toronto, Ontario, Canada, and Ireland, before settling in Herefordshire, England, where he still lives.  Llewellyn has a deep love for the sea, and this has influenced much of his writing. He goes sailing regularly.

He was originally an editor and fine art dealer before becoming an author. He has become a prolific writer, and has written for both children and adults. He has also worked as a journalist with newspapers and magazines from both America and Britain.

Personal life
Llewellyn is married to Canadian children's author Karen Wallace. They have two sons.

Works

Novels for adults

 Gurney's Release (1979)
 Gurney's Revenge (1981) – a.k.a. Sea Devil
 Gurney's Reward (1981)
 Hell Bay, Arch, 1984, 
 Great Circle, Weidenfeld & Nicolson, 1987,  (a.k.a. Sea Story)
 The Shadow in the Sands, 1998,  (a "sequel" to the Erskine Childers novel "The Riddle of the Sands")
 The Sea Garden, 1999, 
 The Iron Hotel, 2000, 
 The Malpas Legacy, 2001,

Navarone series
(written as authorised sequels to the Alistair MacLean novels "The Guns of Navarone" and "Force 10 from Navarone"

 Storm Force from Navarone, HarperCollins, 1996
 Thunderbolt from Navarone, HarperCollins, 1998
 The four Navarone novels are published as an omnibus volume "The Complete Navarone", HarperCollins, 2008 (HB) & 2011 (PB) .

Sailing thrillers
(set in and around the fishing village of Pulteney)

 Dead Reckoning, 1987
 Blood Orange, 1988
 Death Roll, 1989
 Dead Eye, 1990
 Bloodknot, 1991
 Riptide, 1992
 Clawhammer, 1993
 Maelstrom, 1994
 Black Fish, 2010

Non fiction

 The Worst Journey in the Midlands, 1983
 Emperor Smith - the man who built Scilly
 The Minimum Boat, Adlard Coles Nautical, 2010

For children

Monsters of Lyonesse series
 Lyonesse:The Well Between The Worlds, Scholastic 2009
 Lyonesse:Dark Solstice, Scholastic 2010

Darlings series
 Little Darlings, Puffin, 2004, 
 Bad, Bad Darlings, Puffin Books, 2005, 
 Desperado Darlings, Puffin Books, 2006,

Death Eric
 The Return of Death Eric, Puffin, 2005, 
 The Haunting of Death Eric, Puffin Books, 2006,

Others
 The Magic Boathouse, Walker Books Ltd, 1994, 
 The Rope School, Walker Books Ltd, 1995, 
 Pig in the Middle, Walker Books Ltd, 1996, 
 The Polecat Cafe, Walker Books Ltd, 1998, 
 Nelson - the sailor who dared to win, Short Books, 2004, 
 Pegleg, 
 Wonderdog

See also

 Tresco

References

People from the Isles of Scilly
Living people
British children's writers
1948 births
British male novelists